The Balkan Athletics U20 Championships is an annual track and field competition for athletes under-20 years old from the Balkans. Formerly known as the Balkan Athletics Junior Championships, it was first held in 1970 and is organised by Balkan Athletics. It is one of the oldest youth athletics championships, being created in the same year at the European Athletics Junior Championships, though predated by the South American U20 Championships in Athletics.

Nations

 (from 1970)
 (from 1970)
 (from 1970)
 (from 1970)
 (from 1970)
 (from 1992)
 (from 1992)
 (from 1992)
 (from 1992)
 (from 2006)
 (from 2006)
 (from 2013)
 (from 2014)
 (from 2014)
 (from 2014)
 (from 2015)
 (from 2016)

Former nations
 Socialist Federal Republic of Yugoslavia (1970-1990)
 Serbia and Montenegro (1992-2005)

Editions

References

External links
Balkan Games results at GBRAthletics
Balkan Athletics

Athletics competitions in Europe
Recurring sporting events established in 1970
Association of Balkan Athletics Federations competitions
Under-20 athletics competitions